Carolina White (May 23, 1886 – October 5, 1961) was an actress and opera soprano who appeared with Enrico Caruso in My Cousin, one of only two movies the tenor made. She also recorded for the gramophone.

References

External links

white/field/all/mode/all/conn/and/cosuppress/ Carolina White, Univ. of Washington, Sayre Collection
Carolina White lithograph
Carolina White singing Madame Butterfly 1910
Carolina White on the cover of Theatre magazine; April 1914

1886 births
1961 deaths
Actresses from Boston
American film actresses
American opera singers
American silent film actresses
20th-century American actresses
Musicians from Boston
20th-century American singers
Classical musicians from Massachusetts